Limocar is a coach operator in Quebec, Canada.The company was founded in 1979 and operates a fleet of 320 vehicles. It operates the only regular bus service between Montreal and Sherbrooke. It also operates the public transportation service (Conseil Intermunicipal de Transport) for several Quebec municipalities as well as school buses and wheel-chair transportation.

The old Transdev acquired the business in 2007. It is now a subsidiary of the new Transdev.

Public transit operations

 CIT Laurentides  
 CIT Vallée du Richelieu
 CIT Roussillon
 CIT du Sud-Ouest

Expedibus

Expedibus is a package shipping and courier company, operated cooperatively throughout Quebec by Orléans Express, Intercar, Autobus Maheux and Limocar.

See also 
 Gare d'autocars de Montréal

References

External links
 English language website

Bus transport in Quebec
Intercity bus companies of Canada
Transdev
Companies based in Quebec
Boisbriand